The following is a list of notable New Zealand people associated with the military, including those who participated in warfare or saw active service in New Zealand.

Musket Wars

 Hone Heke - Nga Puhi tribal chief and war leader
 Hongi Hika - Nga Puhi tribal chief and war leader
 Te Pēhi Kupe
 Te Rangihaeata
 Te Rauparaha
 Tītore - Nga Puhi tribal chief; led war parties to the East Cape in 1820 and 1821 and participated in the Girls' War

New Zealand Wars

 Samuel Austin - recipient of the New Zealand Cross 
 Duncan Alexander Cameron - Commander of British forces during part of the New Zealand Wars 
 George Jackson Carey
 Robert Carey - Commander of British forces at the Battle of Ōrākau
 Trevor Chute - Commander of British forces during part of the New Zealand Wars 
 Thomas Bernard Collinson - Corps of Royal Engineers, Board of Ordnance, New Zealand, 1846–1850. Hosey's Battle, Whanganui, 1847
 Robert FitzRoy - Captain in Her Majesty’s Royal Navy, Governor and Commander in Chief in and over the Colony of New Zealand, Vice-Admiral of New Zealand, 1843-1845, Colonel of the Auckland Battalion of Militia, 1845. Flagstaff War, 1845
 Charles Emilius Gold - Commander of British forces during the early stages of the First Taranaki War, part of the New Zealand Wars 
 Charles Heaphy - recipient of the Victoria Cross, awarded for his actions during an engagement in the Invasion of the Waikato; a surveyor and explorer prior to the New Zealand Wars, he was later a Member of Parliament
 William Magee Hunter (1834-1868)
 Tāmati Wāka Nene - Māori rangatira (chief) of the Ngāpuhi iwi. British ally, Flagstaff War, 1845–1846
 Marmaduke Nixon - officer in the militia during the Invasion of the Waikato; killed in action at Rangiaowhia 
 William Odgers VC - first man to win the Victoria Cross in the New Zealand land wars
 Thomas Simson Pratt - British commander in the First Taranaki War 
 George Preece - officer in the Armed Constabulary during the later stages of the New Zealand Wars and recipient of the New Zealand Cross
 Kepa Te Rangihiwinui - Maori leader on British side in the Taranaki Wars
 Beauchamp Seymour, 1st Baron Alcester - British naval commander in New Zealand, 1860-1861
 Te Kooti - the founder of the Ringatū religion and guerrilla fighter during the later stages of the New Zealand Wars
 Tītokowaru - Ngāti Ruanui tribal chief and war leader during the later stages of the New Zealand Wars
 Ropata Wahawaha - Ngāti Porou tribal chief who fought on the British side during the later stages of the New Zealand Wars

Boer War
 Edward Chaytor - commanded the Second and Eighth Contingents sent to South Africa; commanded the ANZAC Mounted Division during World War I and was Commandant of the New Zealand Military Forces, from 1919 to 1924
 Janet Gillies, nurse
 William James Hardham - awarded Victoria Cross, later served in World War I 
 John Gethin Hughes - a soldier in the First Contingent sent to South Africa and first New Zealand recipient of the Distinguished Service Order; later commanded an infantry battalion at Gallipoli during World War I
James O'Sullivan - Defence storekeeper at the time of Boer War
 Alfred William Robin - commanded the First Contingent sent to South Africa; later Commandant of the New Zealand Military Forces, from 1914 to 1919

World War I

 Leslie Cecil Lloyd Averill - Platoon Commander and first New Zealander to scale the walls of Le Quesnoy
 Ronald Bannerman - World War I fighter ace
 Cyril Bassett - first soldier of the New Zealand Expeditionary Force to receive the Victoria Cross, awarded for his actions during the Battle of Chunuk Bair at Gallipoli, in August 1915
 Arthur Bauchop - commander of the Otago Mounted Rifles
 Harold Beamish - fighter ace with No. 3 Squadron Royal Naval Air Service
 William Thomas Beck - first New Zealand soldier ashore at Gallipoli
 Charles Mackie Begg - medical officer who served at Gallipoli and on the Western Front
 Charles Henry Brown - officer who served at Gallipoli and commanded an infantry brigade on the Western Front; killed in action during the Battle of Messines in 1917
 Donald Forrester Brown - posthumous recipient of the Victoria Cross, the first such award to a soldier of the New Zealand Expeditionary Force serving on the Western Front
 Keith Caldwell - fighter ace and commander of the Royal Flying Corps' No. 74 Squadron; later a senior officer in the Royal New Zealand Air Force during World War II and the postwar period
 Thomas Culling - first New Zealand fighter ace of World War I  
 James Lloyd Findlay  - soldier and fighter pilot
 Nora FitzGibbon  - nurse
 Harry Fulton - senior officer who commanded an infantry brigade on the Western Front; killed in action in 1918 
 Herbert Ernest Hart - senior officer who served at Gallipoli and commanded an infantry brigade on the Western Front; later administrator of Western Samoa
 Francis Earl Johnston - senior officer who commanded an infantry brigade at Gallipoli and on the Western Front; killed in action in 1917
 George Napier Johnston - Commander Royal Artillery of the New Zealand Division
 George Augustus King - officer who served at Gallipoli and on the Western Front; killed in action during the Battle of Passchendaele in 1917
 Norman Joseph Levien - Ordnance Officer Egypt, Gallipoli, France and United Kingdom
 William George Malone - Commander of the Wellington Infantry Battalion, killed in action at Gallipoli
 Thomas James McCristell - officer in charge of the Ordnance Corps in New Zealand
 Charles Melvill - senior officer who commanded an infantry brigade on the Western Front; later Commandant of New Zealand Military Forces, from 1924 to 1925 
 Arthur Plugge - officer who served at Gallipoli and on the Western Front  
 Andrew Hamilton Russell - Commander of the New Zealand Division
 William Sinclair-Burgess - New Zealand officer serving with Australian forces
 James Waddell - New Zealand soldier serving with the French Foreign Legion 
 Bright Williams - last surviving New Zealand Soldier of the First World War
 Robert Young - senior officer who commanded an infantry brigade on the Western Front; later Commandant of New Zealand Military Forces, from 1925 to 1931

World War II

(some served also in World War I)
 Russell Aitken - pilot in the Royal Air Force who pioneered the use of amphibian aircraft for rescuing downed British pilots during the Battle of Britain
 Leslie Andrew - senior officer who served with the 2NZEF in Greece, Crete, and North Africa; also a Victoria Cross recipient of World War I
 Fred Baker - Commander, 28th Maori Battalion
 Fraser Barron - bomber pilot with the Royal New Zealand Air Force; served with Bomber Command and one of only four personnel of the RNZAF to be awarded the Distinguished Service Order twice 
 Harold Eric Barrowclough - Commander, 3rd New Zealand Division 
 Minden Blake - fighter pilot and flying ace with the Royal Air Force
 Brian Carbury - fighter pilot and flying ace with the Royal Air Force
 Sir Roderick Carr - RAF Bomber Command and Chief of the Indian Air Force
 Johnny Checketts - fighter pilot and flying ace with the Royal New Zealand Air Force; commanded No. 485 Squadron RNZAF for a period in 1943
 George Herbert Clifton - senior officer who served with the 2NZEF in Greece and North Africa
 Wilfred Clouston - fighter pilot and flying ace with the Royal Air Force; commanded fighter squadrons during the course of World War II 
 Basil Collyns - fighter pilot and flying ace with the Royal Air Force
 Sir Arthur Coningham - RAF Second Tactical Air Force commander
 Bill Crawford-Crompton - fighter pilot and flying ace with the Royal Air Force; commanded several squadrons and fighter wings during the course of World War II
 William Cunningham - Commandant of the Fiji Defence Force 
 Dan Davin - 2NZEF officer and author of war history 
 Alan Deere - fighter pilot and flying ace with the Royal Air Force
 Antonio Dini - fighter pilot and flying ace with the Royal Air Force
 John Evelyn Duigan - Chief of General Staff, New Zealand Military Forces, from 1937 to 1941 
 Keith Elliott - soldier and recipient of the Victoria Cross
 Geoffrey Bryson Fisken - RNZAF fighter ace, initially on Brewster Buffalo 
 Baron Freyberg of Wellington - Commander, 2NZEF and 2nd New Zealand Division; later Governor-General of New Zealand 
 Colin Falkland Gray - fighter pilot and flying ace with the Royal Air Force; commanded several squadrons and fighter wings during the course of World War II
 Michael Herrick - fighter pilot and flying ace with the Royal Air Force; commanded No. 15 Squadron RNZAF for a period in 1943
 Jack Hinton - soldier and recipient of the Victoria Cross
 Thomas W. Horton - Commander of No 105 RAF Pathfinder squadron
 Clive Hulme - soldier and recipient of the Victoria Cross
 Lindsay Merritt Inglis - senior officer who served with the 2NZEF in Greece, Crete, North Africa and Italy 
 Edgar James "Cobber" Kain - fighter pilot and flying ace with the Royal Air Force; the first pilot to win a Distinguished Flying Cross in World War II
Thomas Joseph King - DADOS HQ 2nd New Zealand Division
 Howard Karl "Kip" Kippenberger - Commander, 2nd New Zealand Division
 John Noble MacKenzie - fighter pilot and flying ace with the Royal Air Force
 Haane Manahi - soldier and recipient of the Distinguished Conduct Medal
 Owen Mead - senior officer who served with the 2NZEF and the highest ranking soldier of the New Zealand Military Forces to be killed on active service
 Reginald Miles - senior officer who served with the 2NZEF in Greece and North Africa
 Sir Keith Park - No. 11 Group RAF commander during the Battle of Britain; later commanded in Malta and Southeast Asia
 Nigel Park - fighter pilot and flying ace with the Royal New Zealand Air Force; nephew of Sir Keith Park
 Graham Beresford Parkinson - senior officer who served with the 2NZEF in Greece, North Africa and Italy 
 John Pattison - fighter pilot with the Royal Air Force; later transferred to the Royal New Zealand Air Force and commanded No. 485 Squadron RNZAF for a period in 1944–45
 Sir Peter Phipps - founding Chief of Defence Staff 
 Edward Puttick - senior officer who served with the 2NZEF in Greece and Crete; later Chief of General Staff, New Zealand Military Forces, from 1941 to 1945
 Paul Rabone - fighter pilot and flying ace with the Royal Air Force
 Jack Rae - fighter pilot and flying ace with the Royal New Zealand Air Force
 Robert Row - senior officer who served with the 2NZEF in Greece and in the Pacific; commanded 8th Brigade during the Battle of the Treasury Islands
 Warren Schrader - fighter pilot and flying ace with the Royal New Zealand Air Force
 Desmond J. Scott - fighter pilot and flying ace with the Royal New Zealand Air Force
 Irving Smith - fighter pilot and flying ace with the Royal New Zealand Air Force; later served with the Royal Air Force in the postwar period
 Robert Spurdle - fighter pilot and flying ace with the Royal Air Force
 Gray Stenborg - fighter pilot and flying ace with the Royal New Zealand Air Force
 William George Stevens - senior officer who served with the 2NZEF
 Keith Lindsay Stewart - senior officer who served with the 2NZEF in Greece, Crete and Italy; later Chief of General Staff, New Zealand Military Forces, from 1949 to 1952
 Donald Stott - soldier in the 2NZEF, later served in Special Operations Executive and Z Special Unit
 Leonard Trent - pilot and recipient of the Victoria Cross
 Lloyd Alan Trigg - pilot and recipient of the Victoria Cross; only person so awarded solely on recommendation of the enemy
 Charles Upham - soldier of 20th Battalion and two-time recipient of the Victoria Cross
 Nancy Wake - most decorated servicewoman of World War II
 Derek Harland Ward - fighter pilot and flying ace with the Royal Air Force
 James Allen Ward - bomber pilot with the Royal New Zealand Air Force, 75 Squadron RNZAF; recipient of the Victoria Cross
 Norman Weir - senior officer who served with the 2NZEF; later Chief of General Staff, New Zealand Military Forces, from 1946 to 1949
 Edward Wells - fighter pilot and flying ace with the Royal Air Force
 Bert Wipiti - fighter pilot with the Royal New Zealand Air Force

Post-WWII

 Denis Barnett - Commander, British Forces Cyprus
 Richard Bolt - bomber pilot with the Royal New Zealand Air Force during World War II; later Chief of the Air Staff from 1974 to 1976 and then Chief of the Defence Staff from 1976 to 1980
 Sir William Gentry - officer who served with the 2NZEF during World War II; later Chief of General Staff, New Zealand Army, from 1952 to 1955
 Walter McKinnon - officer who served with the 2NZEF during World War II; later Chief of General Staff, New Zealand Army, from 1965 to 1967
 Ian Morrison - bomber pilot with the Royal New Zealand Air Force during World War II; later Chief of the Air Staff from 1962 to 1966
 William Stratton - fighter pilot with the Royal New Zealand Air Force during World War II; later Chief of the Air Staff from 1969 to 1971

See also
List of World War II aces from New Zealand
Military history of New Zealand
New Zealand Defence Force#Previous Chiefs

Notes

References

Military personnel
personnel
Military history of New Zealand